Sardar Muhammad Israr Tareen is a Pakistani politician who has been a member of the National Assembly of Pakistan since August 2018.

Political career

In 2008 General Elections he had won from his constituency NA263, on pml q ticket, by defeating pml n candidate Sardar Yaqub Nasar.Due too election commissions allegation on Sardar Israr Tareen over rigging, he was de seated from his constituency in May 2011, but later he again did petition on his rival candidate and got the decision back in his favour in June 2012, he was again restored to the National assembly and remained member till March 2013. In March 2008, ran for the office of Speaker of the National Assembly of Pakistan but was unsuccessful and lost the office to Fehmida Mirza.

He was elected to the National Assembly of Pakistan from Constituency NA-258 (Loralai-cum-Musakhel-cum-Ziarat-cum-Duki-cum-Harnai) as a candidate of the Balochistan Awami Party in the 2018 Pakistani general election. He took oath as Federal Minister for Defence Production on 19th April 2022, and was inducted in Shahbaz Sharifs Cabinet, after Imran Khans governments dismissal.

References

Living people
Pakistani MNAs 2018–2023
Balochistan Awami Party MNAs
Year of birth missing (living people)
Defence Production Ministers of Pakistan